The Fateful Day is a 1921 German silent film directed by Adolf E. Licho and starring Mady Christians, Kurt Stieler, and Karl Beckersachs.

The film's sets were designed by the art director Robert Neppach.

Cast

References

Bibliography

External links

1921 films
Films of the Weimar Republic
German silent feature films
Films directed by Adolf E. Licho
German black-and-white films
UFA GmbH films